Gaily (23 April 1971 – after 1985) was an American-bred, British-trained Thoroughbred racehorse and broodmare. As a two-year-old in 1973 she failed to win but showed considerable promise in her two races. In the following year she won on her seasonal debut before recording her biggest success in the Irish 1000 Guineas. She went on to finish second in the Irish Oaks and third in the Prix Vermeille before being retired at the end of the season with a record of two wins and four places from nine starts. She went on to become a successful and influential broodmare whose descendants have included Pilsudski, Creachadoir and Landing Light.

Background
Gaily was a "well-made, attractive" brown mare with no white markings bred in Kentucky by Warner L Jones of Hermitage Farm. As a yearling she was offered for sale at Keeneland and was bought for $120,000 by representatives of the British owner and breeder Michael Sobell. The filly was sent to race in Europe and entered training with Dick Hern at West Ilsley in Berkshire, where she was a contemporary of the Queen's filly Highclere.

She was sired by Sir Gaylord, a half brother to Secretariat and a successful racehorse and sire in his own right: his other offspring included Sir Ivor and Habitat. Her dam Spearfish was a high-class racemare who won the Hollywood Oaks and the Santa Susana Stakes in 1966. She later became a very successful broodmare who also produced King's Bishop and Empire Glory.

Racing career

1973: two-year-old season
Gaily made her racecourse debut in a maiden race over six furlongs at Newbury Racecourse in August, and finished second of the sixteen runners, beaten one and a half lengths by the Peter Walwyn-trained Heavenly Form. She was moved up in distance for the Green Shield Stakes over one mile at Ascot Racecourse a month later and finished third to Escorial and Evening Venture after having some problems in obtaining a clear run.

1974: three-year-old season
Gaily recorded her first victory on her three-year-old debut, winning a nineteen-runner maiden over one mile at Ascot in April: it proved to be her last race in England. She was sent to Ireland and moved up in class for the Irish 1000 Guineas on soft ground at the Curragh on 18 May. Ridden by the Australian jockey Ron Hutchinson she started the 11/5 favourite ahead of her fellow British challenger Always Faithful who was partnered by Lester Piggott. The best fancied of the other 15 runners included Silk Buds (winner of the Park Stakes and Silken Glider Stakes), Matuno God (Mulcahy Stakes), Northern Gem (Fred Darling Stakes), Lady Rowe and Perfect Aim. Gaily took the lead at half way, went clear of the field and won easily by one and a half lengths from Northern Gem.

Gaily failed to win her in her five remaining races but ran well in some top-class races. In the Prix de Diane over 2000 metres at Chantilly Racecourse on 14 June she started a 25/1 outsider and finished seventh of the 22 runners behind her stablemate Highclere, who won from Comtesse de Loir. She then returned to the Curragh for the Irish Oaks over one and a half miles on 20 July and finished second to Dibidale with Polygamy in third. In the Prix de la Nonette at Longchamp Racecourse on 1 September she came home sixth behind Paulista when conceding weight to her eleven opponents. Three weeks later at the same track she started a 35/1 outsider in the Prix Vermeille but belied her odds as she finished third of the fifteen runners behind Paulista and Comtesse de Loir. On her final appearance she was unplaced behind Cheryl in the Prix de l'Opéra at Longchamp on 6 October.

Assessment
In 1973he independent Timeform organisation gave the Gaily a rating of 103, 22 pounds behind their best two-year-old filly Melchbourne. In their annual Racehorses of 1973 they described her as "sure to win a race" and likely to stay ten furlongs.  In the following year Timeform described her as "tough, genuine and consistent" and gave her a rating of 121, ten pounds behind their top three-year-old filly Comtesse de Loir.

Breeding record
Gaily was retired from racing to become a broodmare for her owner's Ballymacoll Stud. She produced at least nine foals between 1976 and 1986:

Clean Slate, a bay colt, foaled in 1976, sired by Reform
Gay Milly, bay filly, 1977, by Mill Reef. Won one race, female-line ancestor of Pilsudski, Creachadoir and Fine Motion (Shuka Sho).
Hard To Say, bay colt, 1978, by Lyphard
Glad Tidings, brown filly, 1979, by Pharly. Won two races.
Laughing Boy, bay colt, 1980, by Riverman
Gay Hellene, bay filly, 1982, by Ela-Mana-Mou. Won three races including Prix de Flore dam of Landing Light.
Gay Fantastic, bay filly, 1983, by Ela-Mana-Mou. Dam of Cape Tribulation (Cotswold Chase) and Moon Solitaire (King Edward Stakes).
Grecian Girl, brown filly, 1985, by Ela-Mana-Mou
Glad Man, bay colt, 1986, by Ela-Mana-Mou

Pedigree

References 

1971 racehorse births
Racehorses bred in Kentucky
Racehorses trained in the United Kingdom
Thoroughbred family 11
Irish Classic Race winners